The Barranco Grande Windmill or Grand Canyon Mill is located in Barranco Grande, Santa Cruz de Tenerife, on the island of Tenerife, Spain. It is similar to the Cuevas Blancas Windmill, and is one of three remaining windmills in the region, the other being in El Rosario, Tenerife.

It was mostly demolished by a mechanical shovel on 27 January 1973. It was listed as Bien de Interés Cultural on 18 December 2007.

The remains were acquired by the Santa Cruz town hall in 2007, who subsequently contracted its restoration to Volconsa at a cost of €425,000. The mill was not completely reconstructed, but the blades and gears were recreated in 2010, and former parts of the windmill are now arranged around the remains.

References 

Buildings and structures in Santa Cruz de Tenerife
Windmills in Spain